Heather Simpson may refer to:

 Heather Simpson (civil servant), former chief of staff for New Zealand PM Helen Clark
 Heather Simpson (journalist), Scottish broadcast journalist and presenter